Yellow Creek is a special service area located in the parkland area of east-central Saskatchewan within the Rural Municipality of Invergordon No. 430. It previously held the status of village until August 15, 2009. The community is located northeast of Wakaw on Highway 41. It is named after the creek that flows through it. The area consists mostly of Ukrainians and Hungarians.

Demographics 

See also 
List of communities in Saskatchewan

References 

Designated places in Saskatchewan
Former villages in Saskatchewan
Invergordon No. 430, Saskatchewan
Special service areas in Saskatchewan
Populated places disestablished in 2009
Division No. 15, Saskatchewan